The FIFA Arab Cup, or simply Arab Cup, is an international association football competition which has been organized by FIFA since 2021, and is contested by the senior men's national teams of the Union of Arab Football Associations (UAFA), the sport's governing body for countries in the Arab world. The current champion is Algeria, which won its first title at the 2021 tournament in Qatar. 

The championship's inaugural edition was in 1963, held in Lebanon, which was won by Tunisia. After having been played in 1964 and 1966, the Arab Cup was halted for almost 20 years, before being contested in 1985. The tournament was played five more times until 2012, the last competition organized by the UAFA. The 2021 edition was the first organized by FIFA.

The ten Arab Cup tournaments have been won by six national teams. Iraq have won four times; the other Arab Cup winners are Saudi Arabia, with two titles; Algeria, Egypt, Morocco, and inaugural winner Tunisia, with one title each.

Seven countries have hosted the Arab Cup. Kuwait, Qatar and Saudi Arabia have each hosted twice, while Lebanon, Iraq, Jordan and Syria have each hosted once. All Arab Cups have been held in Asia.

History
The initial idea for the conception of an Arab Cup came in 1957 from Lebanese journalist Nassif Majdalani and the Secretary General of the Lebanese Football Association (LFA) Izzat Al Turk. In 1962, the LFA called for the formal establishment of the tournament through their president Georges Dabbas, who organised a general Arab assembly for the formation of the Arab Cup. The first Arab Cup was held in Beirut between April and May 1963, with the participation of five teams.

During the 16-year hiatus between 1966 and 1982, the Arab Cup was de facto replaced by the Palestine Cup, which was held three times in the 1970s and then became a youth tournament after the return of the Arab Cup in the 1980s. The 1992 Arab Cup was also organised as part of the 1992 Pan Arab Games.

The 2021 edition was the first edition to be organised by FIFA; the competition was renamed FIFA Arab Cup. Following the 2021 final, FIFA President Gianni Infantino announced that FIFA would continue to oversee future editions.

Results

a.e.t.: after extra time
p: after penalty shoot-out
TBD: to be determined
Notes

Teams reaching the top four

* hosts

Best performances by confederations

Records and statistics

Comprehensive team results by tournament
Legend

 – Champions
 – Runners-up
 – Third place
 – Fourth place
 – Semi-final (no third place match)

GS – Group stage
Q — Qualified for upcoming tournament
 — Did not qualify
 — Did not participate
 — Hosts

For each tournament, the number of teams in each finals tournament are shown (in parentheses).

See also
 Arab Women's Cup
 Football at the Pan Arab Games
 WAFF Championship
 Arabian Gulf Cup

Notes

References

External links 

 
 Arab Cup at the RSSSF

 
FIFA competitions for national teams
Union of Arab Football Associations competitions
International association football competitions in Africa
International association football competitions in Asia
International association football competitions in the Middle East
Recurring sporting events established in 1963
Association football events